Hameur Hizem (born 22 September 1937) is a former Tunisian football manager who coached the Tunisia national football team.

References

1937 births
Living people
Tunisian footballers
Tunisian football managers
Club Africain football managers
Tunisia national football team managers
US Monastir (football) players
US Monastir (football) managers
Association footballers not categorized by position
Ohod Club managers
Saudi Professional League managers